The 2012–13 Copa Argentina was the fourth edition of the Copa Argentina, and the second since the relaunch of the tournament in 2011. The competition began on October 23, 2012. The tournament featured 224 clubs from the top four levels of the Argentine football league system. The winner (Arsenal) qualified for the 2014 Copa Libertadores and the 2013 Supercopa Argentina.

Teams
Two hundred and twenty-four teams took part in this competition including: All the teams from the Primera División (20), Primera B Nacional (20), Primera B Metropolitana (21), Torneo Argentino A (25), Primera C (20), Torneo Argentino B (100), and Primera D (18).

Primera División

 All Boys
  Argentinos Juniors
 Arsenal
 Atlético de Rafaela
 Belgrano

  Boca Juniors
 Colón
  Estudiantes (LP)
 Godoy Cruz
 Independiente

 Lanús
 Newell's Old Boys
  Quilmes
 Racing
 River Plate

  San Lorenzo
 San Martín (SJ)
 Tigre
 Unión (SF)
 Vélez Sársfield

Primera B Nacional

 Aldosivi
 Almirante Brown
 Atlético Tucumán
 Banfield
 Boca Unidos

 Crucero del Norte
  Defensa y Justicia
 Deportivo Merlo
 Douglas Haig
 Ferro Carril Oeste

 Gimnasia y Esgrima (J)
  Gimnasia y Esgrima (LP)
  Huracán
 Independiente Rivadavia
 Instituto

  Nueva Chicago
 Olimpo
  Patronato
 Rosario Central
 Sarmiento (J)

Primera B Metropolitana

 Acassuso
 Almagro
 Atlanta
 Barracas Central
 Brown
 Central Córdoba (R)

 Chacarita Juniors
 Colegiales
 Comunicaciones
 Defensores de Belgrano
 Deportivo Armenio

 Deportivo Morón
 Estudiantes (BA)
 Flandria
 Los Andes
 Platense

 San Telmo
 Temperley
 Tristán Suárez
 Villa Dálmine
  Villa San Carlos

Torneo Argentino A

 Alumni (VM)
  Alvarado
 Central Córdoba (SdE)
 Central Norte
 Cipolletti
 Defensores de Belgrano (VR)
 Deportivo Maipú

 Desamparados
 Gimnasia y Esgrima (CdU)
 Gimnasia y Tiro
 Guaraní Antonio Franco
 Guillermo Brown
 Juventud Antoniana

 Juventud Unida Universitario
 Libertad (S)
 Racing (C)
 Racing (O)
 Rivadavia (L)
 San Jorge (T)

 San Martín (T)
 Santamarina
 Sportivo Belgrano
 Talleres (C)
 Tiro Federal
 Unión (MdP)

Primera C

  Argentino (M)
 Berazategui
 Defensores de Cambaceres
  Defensores Unidos
 Deportivo Español

 Deportivo Laferrere
 Dock Sud
 El Porvenir
 Excursionistas
 Fénix

 Ferrocarril Midland
 General Lamadrid
 J. J. de Urquiza
 Liniers
Luján

  Sacachispas
  San Miguel
 Sportivo Italiano
  Talleres (RE)
  UAI Urquiza

Torneo Argentino B

 9 de Julio (M)
 9 de Julio (R)
 Alianza (CM)
 Alianza (CC)
 Altos Hornos Zapla
 Alvear
 Américo Tesiorieri
  Andes Talleres
 Andino
 Argentino Agropecuario
 Atenas (RC)
 Belgrano (P)
 Bella Vista (BB)
 Ben Hur
 Boca (RG)
 Chaco For Ever
 Colegiales (C)
 CAI
 Comunicaciones (M)
 Concepción (BRS)
 Concepción
 Cruz del Sur
 Defensores (P)
 Defensores (S)
 Deportivo Aguilares

 Deportivo Madryn
 Deportivo Mandiyú
 Deportivo Patagones
  Deportivo Roca
 El Linqueño
 Estudiantes (RC)
 Estudiantes (SL)
 Famaillá
 Ferro Carril Oeste (GP)
 Ferro Carril Sud
 Fontana
 General Paz Juniors
 Germinal
 Gimnasia y Esgrima (Mza)
 Grupo Universitario (T)
 Guaymallén
  Güemes
 Gutiérrez
 Huracán (CR)
 Huracán (G)
 Huracán (LH)
  Huracán (SR)
 Huracán (TA)
 Independiente (C)
 Independiente (N)

 Independiente (RC)
 Jorge Brown (P)
 Jorge Newbery (CR)
 Jorge Newbery (VT)
 Juventud Alianza
 Juventud Unida (G)
  La Emilia
 Las Heras (C)
 Liniers (BB)
 Maronese
 Mercedes
  Mitre (S)
  Mitre (SdE)
 Monterrico San Vicente
 Once Tigres
 Pacífico
 Paraná
 Policial
 Sportivo Peñarol
 Racing (T)
 River Plate (E)
 Rosamonte
v San Jorge (SF)
 San Lorenzo (A)
  San Martín (F)

 San Martín (M)
 Sanjustino
 Sarmiento (C)
  Sarmiento (R)
 Sarmiento (SdE)
 Sol de América (F)
 Sol de Mayo
 Sportivo Del Bono
 Sportivo Fernández
 Sportivo Huracán (GG)
 Sportivo Las Parejas
 Sportivo Patria
 Sportivo Rivadavia
 Talleres (P)
 Textil Mandiyú
 Tiro Federal (BB)
 Tiro Federal (M)
 Trinidad
 Uruguay
 Unión Aconquija
  Unión (S)
 Unión (VK)
 Villa Belgrano
 Villa Cubas (C)
 Villa Mitre

Primera D

 Argentino (Q)
 Argentino (R)
 Atlas
 Cañuelas
  Central Ballester

 Centro Español
 Claypole
 Deportivo Paraguayo
 Deportivo Riestra
 Ituzaingó

 Juventud Unida
 Leandro N. Alem
 Lugano
 Muñiz

 Puerto Nuevo
 San Martín (B)
 Victoriano Arenas
 Yupanqui

Format
The tournament was competed in two phases organized in multiple single-elimination rounds.

The first phase consisted of four rounds divided between Metropolitan and Interior zones. The first round involved the 100 teams from the Torneo Argentino B in a single elimination round. The second round was played by the 50 winners from the first round along with the 18 teams of the Primera D Metropolitana and the 7 lowest teams plus the most recently promoted team of the Primera C Metropolitana. The third round had the 13 winners of the Metropolitan zones from the last round plus the 12 remaining teams from the Primera C Metropolitana and the 21 teams of the Primera B Metropolitana, producing 23 teams. This round also saw the 25 winners of the Interior zones against the 25 teams of the Torneo Argentina A, producing 25 teams. The final round of the first phase saw 48 winners of the previous round (23 from the Metropolitan zone and 25 from the Interior zone) in a single elimination producing 24 teams that enter the second phase.

The Second Phase began with a classification round where the 16 non-champion teams of the B Nacional determined the 8 teams to move forward. The next round saw the 24 teams from the first phase, the 8 winners of the previous round, the remaining champion teams of the Primera B Nacional (Huracán, Ferro Carril Oeste, Rosario Central, and Banfield), and the 12 non-champion teams from the Primera Division in four brackets. The 8 champion teams (River Plate, Boca Juniors, Independiente, Vélez Sársfield, Racing, San Lorenzo, Estudiantes (LP), and Newell's Old Boys) joined the bracket with 24 winning teams.

Preliminary phase

Initial phase

First round

Second round

Third round

Fourth round

Final phase

Preliminary round

Elimination round

Zone 1

Zone 2

Zone 3

Zone 4

Final phase
The Final Phase will consist of the Round of 32, Round of 16, Quarterfinals, Semifinals, and the Final. Beginning in the Round of 32, the thirty-two qualified teams will be split into four groups. Each group will consist of eight Primera División teams, and twenty-four winners from the Final Phase. Each group will contest their matches in a specific location chosen by the organizing committee.

Upper bracket

Lower bracket

Final

Top goalscorers

Source:

References

External links
Official site  
Copa Argentina on the Argentine Football Association's website 

2012–13 in Argentine football
2012
2012–13 domestic association football cups